Michael Steven Lewis-Beck (born October 29, 1943) is an American political scientist and the F. Wendell Miller Distinguished Professor of Political Science at the University of Iowa. His research focuses on comparative politics, political forecasting, and political methodology. He was formerly the editor-in-chief of the American Journal of Political Science from 1993 to 1994. He has received media attention for his predictions of the results of United States presidential elections based on economic factors. He predicted that George H. W. Bush would win the 1992 presidential election, that Bill Clinton would win in 1996, and that Al Gore would win easily in 2000, telling the Washington Post that May that "It's not even going to be close." After Gore lost the 2000 election, Lewis-Beck modified his model to take job growth during the incumbent president's previous four-year term into account. He predicted in August 2004 that George W. Bush would receive 51% of the vote in that November's election, making it too close to call.

References

External links
Faculty page

Living people
1943 births
American political scientists
Ball State University alumni
University of Michigan alumni
University of Iowa faculty
Political science journal editors